Ronald Wallwork may refer to

 Ron Wallwork (born 1941), British racewalker
 Ronnie Wallwork (born 1977), English footballer